Jamie Murray and John Peers were the defending champions, but Murray chose to participate in the Davis Cup quarterfinals instead. Peers played alongside Henri Kontinen and successfully defended the title, defeating Daniel Nestor and Aisam-ul-Haq Qureshi in the final, 7–5, 6–3.

Seeds

Draw

Draw

Qualifying

Seeds

Qualifiers
  Kenny de Schepper /  Axel Michon

Lucky losers
  Daniel Masur /  Cedrik-Marcel Stebe

Qualifying draw

References
 Main Draw
 Qualifying Draw

Doubles